Mohiabad (also Romanized as Moḩīābād, Mohīābād, and Mohyābād; formerly, Muhyiddinabad (Persian: محي آباد), also Romanized as Muhyiddin Abad) is a city in Mahan District, Kerman County, Kerman Province, Iran.  At the 2006 census, its population was 3,493, in 892 families.

References

Populated places in Kerman County

Cities in Kerman Province